Oxygiene 23 were an American trance music group based out of Chicago, Illinois. The nucleus of the band comprised keyboardist Van Christie, vocalist Jane Jensen and wind player and percussionist Jim Marcus. The theme of the band's somber compositions was informed by mythology and new-age music. The band released one studio album titled Blue in 1995 for Fifth Colvmn Records.

History
Oxygiene 23 was formed in Chicago by musicians Van Christie, Jane Jensen and Jim Marcus. Marcus and Christie were still writing and performing in Die Warzau when they recruited vocalist and released the song "Sacrifice" in 1993 for the Invisible Records compilation Can You See It Yet?. In 1995 Oxygiene 23 released their debut full-length studio album Blue for Fifth Colvmn Records. The album was recorded with the contributions of Christopher Hall from Stabbing Westward and Mars Williams from The Waitresses. That year the song "Good for You" from their debut was released on the various artist compilation Forced Cranial Removal by Fifth Colvmn Records. After their debut Oxygiene 23's members turned their attention to other projects, with Jim Marcus and Van Christie returning to Die Warzau and Jane Jensen releasing her solo debut Comic Book Whore in 1996 for Interscope Records.

Discography
Studio albums
 Blue (1995, Fifth Colvmn)

Compilation appearances
 Can You See It Yet? (1993 Invisible)
 Forced Cranial Removal (1995 Fifth Colvmn)

References

External links 
 
 

Musical groups established in 1993
Musical groups disestablished in 1995
1993 disestablishments in Illinois
1995 disestablishments in Illinois
Musical groups from Chicago
American ambient music groups
American electronic music groups
American new-age music groups
American trance music groups
Fifth Colvmn Records artists